The Scandinavian Touring Car Championship (STCC) is a touring car racing series based in Scandinavia. The series took over from the Danish Touringcar Championship and Swedish Touring Car Championship, with its first season in 2011. The Scandinavian Touring Car Cup was awarded in 2010 to the driver with best results from selected races in the Danish and Swedish seasons.

In 2013, the series merged with the rival TTA – Racing Elite League, which was formed as a result of the split in 2012. From the 2013 season onwards, the series would see a new format based upon the TTA series.

After the change to the TCR ruleset 2017, The follow-up series is the TCR Scandinavia Touring Car Championship.
For the 2019 season STCC changed promotor to a constellation called Scandinavian Racing League (SRL). For season 2020 and forward STCC brand and championship changed promotor again to SNB-events AB.

Champions

Event Winners

Scandinavian Touring Car Cup

Scandinavian Touring Car Championship

STCC – Racing Elite League

References

External links

 

Touring car racing series
Swedish Touring Car Championship
Inter-Nordic sports competitions
2011 establishments in Sweden
Recurring sporting events established in 2011